My Name is... was a talent show television program founded by the Dutch television host, Albert Verlinde and broadcast by the Belgium and Dutch television channels VTM and RTL4. The format was also purchased by the German and French television.

References 

Dutch reality television series
Dutch-language television shows
RTL 4 original programming
VTM (TV channel) original programming